Vanessa Marques Malho (born 12 April 1996) is a Portuguese football midfielder who plays for S.C. Braga and the Portugal women's national football team.

International goals

References

External links 
 
 Profile at S.C. Braga 
 

1996 births
Living people
Portuguese women's footballers
Portugal women's international footballers
Women's association football midfielders
S.C. Braga (women's football) players
Campeonato Nacional de Futebol Feminino players
Footballers from Lyon
Portuguese people of French descent
Valadares Gaia F.C. (women) players
UEFA Women's Euro 2022 players
UEFA Women's Euro 2017 players